Scooter: Secret Agent is an Australian children's television program screened on Network Ten in 2005.

Plot summary
Scooter is an extremely clumsy teenager who finds a computer belonging to the world's greatest Secret Agent. Scooter decides to complete the missions meant for Agent X-19 in a world of master criminals and high-tech gadgets while continuing to work as a pizza delivery boy.

Cast list
 Martin Sharpe as Scooter Carpenter
 Talia Zucker as Melanie
 Charlene Tjoe as Katrina
 John McTernan as Mackenna
 Rodney Afif as Ratborough
 Kenneth Ransom as Fridge
 Tony Nikolakopoulos as Attilio
 Kate Fitzpatrick as Taipan
 Jamie Mezzasalma as Mario
 Brianna Tab as Herself
 Luke O'Loughlin as Lewis

Episodes
Operation: Destiny (28 January 2005)
Operation: Trainspotting (4 February 2005)
Operation: Chocolate Soldier (11 February 2005)
Operation: Whistler (18 February 2005)
Operation: Mask-In-A-Can (25 February 2005)
Operation: Microdroid (4 March 2005)
Operation: Little Dragon (11 March 2005)
Operation: Mummy's Guide (18 March 2005)
Operation: Songbird (25 March 2005)
Operation: Supernatural (1 April 2005)
Operation: Con-Artist (8 April 2005)
Operation: Alien (15 April 2005)
Operation: Beast Boy (22 April 2005)
Operation: Down the Drain (29 April 2005)
Operation: Double Oh (6 May 2005)
Operation: Dollface (13 May 2005)
Operation: Wombat (20 May 2005)
Operation: Aphrodite (27 May 2005)
Operation: Crystal Clear (3 June 2005)
Operation: Under Par (10 June 2005)
Operation: Stealth (17 June 2005)
Operation: Senior Citizen (24 June 2005)
Operation: Kidnap (1 July 2005)
Operation: Replication (8 July 2005)
Operation: Deception (15 July 2005)
Operation: Endgame (22 July 2005)

See also
 List of Australian television series

External links
Scooter: Secret Agent – ZDF Enterprises promotional website
Scooter: Secret Agent at the Australian Television Information Archive
Scooter: Secret Agent Official site

Network 10 original programming
Australian children's television series
2005 Australian television series debuts
2005 Australian television series endings
Australian science fiction television series
English-language television shows
Fictional secret agents and spies
Television series about teenagers